is one of the 10 wards in Sapporo, Hokkaidō, Japan. The ward is located in northwest of Sapporo, which is neighboured to three other wards in Sapporo and two cities. The area was established as one of the wards in Sapporo in 1989, when it was split from Nishi-ku, Sapporo.

Overview 

According to the jūminhyō (registry of current residential addresses and figures) in 2008, 138,570 people are living in Teine-ku. The total area of the ward is 56.92 km², which is the 6th largest ward in Sapporo. Surrounded by a rich natural environment, Teine-ku has a number of mountain ranges and rivers including Mount Teine, whose height is 1,023.7 metres.

It is adjacent to three other wards in Sapporo: Kita-ku, Nishi-ku, and Minami-ku, and two cities: Ishikari, and Otaru.

The name Teine is derived of a word "teyne-i" in Ainu language, which means a "marsh" or "wet place". It is currently written as "手稲" in kanji, which is respectively translated as "hand" for "手" and "rice plant" for "稲".

History 

In 1872, Teine Village was established after being split from Hassamu Village. The village was later divided into two villages (Kami-Teine village and Shimo-Teine village) in 1874. The Garuishi Kidō, a Horsecar company, has established and laid horsecar line, which was abolished in 1940.

The area was reorganized as Teine Town in 1951. It was merged into Sapporo City in 1967, and also merged into Nishi-ku in 1972, when Sapporo was listed as one of the cities designated by government ordinance. In 1989, Teine-ku was established after being split from Nishi-ku.

Geography

Climate

Education

Universities
 Hokkaido University of Science
 Hokkaido College of Pharmacy

College
 Hokkaido Automotive Engineering College

High schools
 Hokkaido Sapporo Teine High School
 Hokkaido Sapporo Touun High School
 Hokkaido Sapporo Asukaze High School

Transportation
 Hakodate Main Line: Hoshimi - Hoshioki - Inaho - Teine - Inazumi-Kōen
 Sasson Expressway: Sapporo-nishi IC - Teine IC - Kanayama PA
 Route 5

1972 Winter Olympics
The 1972 Winter Olympics were held in Sapporo, and Mount Teine hosted the alpine skiing (giant slalom and slalom only), bobsleigh, and luge events.

Mascot 

Teine's mascot is  who is a mixed dog/polar bear/rabbit kamuy. As a result, it had five ears that resembled fingers. It resides in a special room in the ward office. It is accidentally discovered at Mt. Teine on November 6, 1989 when it smelled alcohol. It likes pumpkins, watermelons and cream bread (which give its nose its colour). It struggles to control with its body temperature. It is still learning the human language.

References

External links 

 Teine tte Īne - Official homepage of Teine-ku 

 
Wards of Sapporo